The 2008 Daytona 500, the 50th annual running of the event, was held on February 17, 2008 at Daytona International Speedway in Daytona Beach, Florida. The race was the 50th to be run since the first in 1959, won by Lee Petty. To commemorate the event, the Harley J. Earl Trophy, which goes to the winner of the race, was plated in gold instead of silver. In addition, the winning car was placed on display for one year at the Daytona 500 Experience attraction just outside Turn Four. Ryan Newman won the race, his only win in the 2008 season and his final win for team owner Roger Penske.

A number of firsts
The race was the first Daytona 500 win for Penske Racing and the first run using NASCAR's Car of Tomorrow, which was introduced in 2007 and became standard in 2008. Additionally, this was the first official race under the new Sprint Cup banner as the telecommunications giant replaces Nextel as the series sponsor after their 2005 merger. Ryan Newman's victory with the number 12 car in the Daytona 500 was the first time since Bobby Allison's #12 won the race in 1988, 20 years prior.

Television and radio coverage
The race was televised on FOX in the USA, with the telecast scheduled beginning at 2 p.m. EST. 1960 Daytona 500 winner Junior Johnson drove the pace car and the green flag was waved the honorary starter, seven-time race winner Richard Petty around 3:30 p.m. Radio coverage was handled by MRN Radio and started at about 2:30 EST. Trisha Yearwood performed the national anthem, followed by a flyover from the U.S. Air Force Thunderbirds precision flying team. As many as 31 past champions of this race served as Grand Marshals for this historic event to deliver the command to start the engines.

Celebrity tickets for charity
To commemorate the golden running of "The Great American Race", Daytona International Speedway held a “Celebrity Tickets for Charity” competition. Those designs were whittled on daytona500.com by internet users down to the top ten choices. Celebrities including Daytona 500 winners Kevin Harvick, Dale Earnhardt Jr., Michael Waltrip, Jimmie Johnson and Mario Andretti, sitcom stars Jason Lee and Leah Remini, TV hosts Kelly Ripa (Live with Regis and Kelly), Jeff Foxworthy (Are You Smarter Than a 5th Grader?) and Carson Daly (Last Call with Carson Daly), NASCAR announcers Mike Joy from FOX and Dr. Jerry Punch from ESPN, wrestler Goldberg and skateboarding legend Tony Hawk submitted ticket designs. A blue-ribbon panel made up of NASCAR's family selected the winner and announced it prior to the running of the Pepsi 400, with the ten finalists among Harvick (defending 2007 champion), Earnhardt Jr. (2004 winner), Andretti (1967 winner) and Marvin Panch (1961 winner), Hawk, Joy, Katie Cole (the second of two designs), Foxworthy, and two children – 17-year-old Patrick McRae (for Jimmie Johnson, the 2006 winner) and seven-year-old Derek Wynne (for owner Rick Hendrick). Foxworthy was later declared the winner of the contest and his winning ticket artwork along with the others of all the celebrities were auctioned off to benefit the Jeff Gordon Foundation.

Purse
As befitting the official start of the NASCAR season, the posted awards (announced on January 28, 2008) was a record $18,689,238 (US), with the winning team and their driver taking home a minimum of $1,445,250.

Entry List
 (W) denotes past 500 winner.
 (R) denotes rookie driver.

Qualifying

Pole
As is the unique approach that is The Great American Race, qualifying, which was held on February 10, only the top two drivers (which will be the front row) were locked in, with Jimmie Johnson taking position one and Michael Waltrip sitting next to him.  Also qualifying via the fastest speeds among the "Go or Go Home" entries were Joe Nemechek and David Reutimann.

Gatorade Duels

The remaining spots were determined by the top finishers excluding the front row drivers in two  races called the Gatorade Duels, which were raced February 14, which filled the next 36 positions.  The remaining spots were determined by exemptions and the fastest speeds and a champions provisional.

Results of the Duels
Drivers in boldface qualified to the Daytona 500.

Race 1 Results

Also advancing to Daytona 500: 83-Brian Vickers

Race 2 Results

NOTE: Race #2 was extended four laps due to green-white-checker finish rule.Failed to qualify:''
Race One: 84-A. J. Allmendinger, 21-Bill Elliott, 60-Boris Said, 09-Sterling Marlin, and 08-Carl Long.
Race Two: 49-Ken Schrader, 10-Patrick Carpentier, 37-Eric McClure, 27-Jacques Villeneuve, 50-Stanton Barrett Jr.

Race
In the beginning of the race, Jimmie Johnson and Michael Waltrip started on the front row. For the first 151 laps, there were only two caution flags, both thrown for debris. Jeff Gordon went to the garage after leading a few laps due to a broken suspension. On lap 161, David Ragan tried to block Matt Kenseth but brought out the 3rd caution when Ragan squeezed Kenseth into the wall. The next caution flew on lap 176, when Johnson spun out on the backstretch, and Martin Truex Jr. spun because of the shuffle in the field. Clint Bowyer led the next two laps, but was shuffled through the field and was eventually spun by Juan Pablo Montoya, bringing out the 5th caution. However, he did not have any damage from the crash. The biggest crash occurred on lap 189 when Kevin Harvick knocked Dave Blaney into the wall, collecting Mark Martin, Michael Waltrip, Casey Mears, Denny Hamlin, Travis Kvapil, and Carl Edwards. Mears did not pit and wound up 4th in the field despite minor damage. On lap 195, Jeff Burton worked his way up to first. Mears tried to block Tony Stewart, who went with Burton, but turned himself into the wall, bringing out another caution. Burton had a fuel problem on the restart, resulting in Stewart passing him on the outside, bringing Ryan Newman, Kurt and Kyle Busch and Reed Sorenson. Stewart led the next two laps. On the last lap, Ky. Busch jumped to the inside, bringing Stewart with him. Newman was on the outside now. It was a shootout going into the final turn between Newman, Stewart, and the Busch Brothers. Ky. Busch jumped to the inside of Stewart, but Ku. Busch pushed Newman, allowing him to win the 50th running of the Daytona 500.

Results

(W) – Denotes former race winner.
(R) – Denotes rookie.

• – Led most laps

Average Speed: 
Margin of Victory: .092 seconds
Time of Race: Three hours, 16 minutes and 30 seconds
Lead Changes: 42 among 17 drivers
Cautions: Seven for 23 laps

* — On Wednesday, February 20, NASCAR docked Robby Gordon and his self-owned team both 100 owner and driver points for violations during the first day of inspections back on February 8, including an illegal nose cover. His crew chief, Frank Kerr, was fined $100,000, suspended for the next six races starting at California, and was placed on probation until 12/31/08 as a result. An appeal, heard on March 5, the points penalties and the Kerr suspension were overturned, however, the fine was increased to $150,000,

Gallery

References

External links

 Daytona 500 official website
 NASCAR.com web site
 Official entry list from Jayski.com 

Daytona 500
Daytona 500
NASCAR races at Daytona International Speedway
February 2008 sports events in the United States